Mary C. Waters (born  1957) is an American sociologist and author. She is a professor at Harvard University.

Personal
Waters grew up in Brooklyn, New York and currently lives in Cambridge, Massachusetts. She is married and has three children.

Career
Waters earned her B.A. in Philosophy from Johns Hopkins University in 1978. She went on to earn her first M.A. in Demography in 1981 and her second M.A. in 1983 from the University of California at Berkeley, along with her PhD in Sociology in 1986. She has taught at Harvard University since 1986 and is the M.E. Zukerman Professor of Sociology.

Waters specializes in the study of immigration, identity formation and  inter-group relations, with an emphasis on ethnic and racial identity among the children of immigrants.

She is noted for her concept of ethnic option, according to which the children and descendants of immigrants have the option of choosing whether or not to identify with the ethnicity of their ancestors. Waters notes, however, that there are four specific factors which influence that choice: “knowledge about ancestors, surname, looks, and the relative rankings of the groups.” The term first appeared in her book Ethnic Options, Choosing Identities in America.

Awards and honors
In 1993, Waters was awarded a Guggenheim Fellowship by the John Simon Guggenheim Memorial Foundation.
In 2005, Waters was elected to the American Philosophical Society.
In 2006, she was elected to the American Academy of Arts and Sciences.
In 2010, she was elected to the National Academy of Sciences.

Works

Books 

 (ed.)
 (ed.)
 
 (ed.)
 (ed.)

 (ed.)

Chapters in books

References

American women sociologists
American sociologists
1956 births
Living people
Harvard University faculty
Johns Hopkins University alumni
UC Berkeley College of Letters and Science alumni
Members of the American Philosophical Society